Laurel Airport  is a public-use airport located one nautical mile (2 km) southwest of the central business district of Laurel, a city in Sussex County, Delaware, United States. It is privately owned by Dest Inc.

It is currently referred to as Laurel Airport by both the Federal Aviation Administration and Delaware Department of Transportation. However, it had been renamed Western Sussex Airport-Booth Field by a prior owner known as Aerospace House Inc.

Facilities and aircraft 
It has one runway designated 15/33, with a turf surface measuring 3,175 by 270 ft (968 x 82 m).

For the 12-month period ending July 26, 2005, the airport had 7,750 general aviation aircraft operations, an average of 21 per day.

The airport also offers a skydiving program, Skydive Delmarva.

References

External links 
  at Delaware DOT website
 
 

Airports in Delaware
Transportation buildings and structures in Sussex County, Delaware